This is a list of public holidays in Seychelles.

January 1: New Year's Day
January 2: New Year Holiday
Variable (March or April): Good Friday 
Variable (March or April): Holy Saturday
Variable (March or April): Easter Monday
May 1: Labour Day
Variable: Feast of Corpus Christi
June 18: Constitution Day
June 29: National Day, marks the date when Seychelles gained independence from the United Kingdom in 1976.
August 15: Assumption Day
November 1: All Saints Day
December 8: Immaculate Conception
December 25: Christmas Day

References 

Seychellois culture
Seychelles
Seychelles